John Carl Hinshaw (July 28, 1894 – August 5, 1956) was a United States representative from California from 1939 to 1956.

Biography 
He was born in Chicago, Illinois, son of William Wade and Anna Williams Hinshaw. He attended the public schools and Valparaiso University. He graduated from Princeton University in 1916 and pursued a postgraduate course in business administration at the University of Michigan at Ann Arbor.

He served overseas as a First Lieutenant in the Sixteenth Railroad Engineers from May 1917 to September 1919 during and immediately after World War I. He was then discharged as a captain in the Corps of Engineers. He served as laborer, salesman, and manager in automotive manufacturing in Chicago from 1920-1926. He also engaged in investment banking in 1927 and 1928.

Hinshaw moved to Pasadena, California in 1929 and engaged in the real estate and insurance business. He was an unsuccessful candidate for election in 1936 to the Seventy-fifth Congress.

Congress 
He was elected as a Republican to the Seventy-sixth and to the eight succeeding Congresses and served from January 3, 1939 until his death in Bethesda, Maryland in 1956. He had been renominated in the June 1956 primary election. He was buried in Rock Creek Cemetery, Washington, D.C.

Hinshaw was a member of the  Committee on Interstate and Foreign Commerce, the Joint Atomic Energy Committee, and the Congressional Air Policy Board (Vice-Chairman, 1947). He received the Air Force Association's Citation of Honor in 1948, and in 1953 Hinshaw received the National Aeronautic Association's Wright Brothers Memorial Trophy "For his service as a Member of the House of Representatives in fostering the sound and consistent growth of aviation in all its forms, so that it might become a deterrent to war and that it might increasingly become an important carrier of the people and the commerce of the world."

See also
 List of United States Congress members who died in office (1950–99)

References

Sources

 "Carl Hinshaw, Late a Representative from California," Memorial Services, Eighty-Fifth Congress, First Session (United States Government Printing Office, Washington, 1957)

External links
 

1894 births
1956 deaths
Politicians from Chicago
Valparaiso University alumni
Princeton University alumni
United States Army officers
United States Army personnel of World War I
Ross School of Business alumni
Republican Party members of the United States House of Representatives from California
20th-century American politicians
Military personnel from Illinois